Nelson Omba Munganga (born 27 March 1993 in Kinshasa, Zaire) is a Congolese professional footballer who plays as a defensive midfielder for Maghreb de Fès.

International career
Munganga was called up to the DR Congo national football team for the 2015 Africa Cup of Nations, and came on as a substitute in the Group B match against Cape Verde.

International goals
Scores and results list DR Congo's goal tally first, score column indicates score after each Munganga goal.

Honours
DR Congo
 Africa Cup of Nations bronze: 2015

References

1993 births
Living people
Democratic Republic of the Congo footballers
Democratic Republic of the Congo international footballers
Association football midfielders
AS Vita Club players
MC Oujda players
Maghreb de Fès players
2015 Africa Cup of Nations players
Democratic Republic of the Congo expatriate footballers
Expatriate footballers in Morocco
Democratic Republic of the Congo expatriate sportspeople in Morocco
2016 African Nations Championship players
Democratic Republic of the Congo A' international footballers